Grammostola actaeon is a New World spider also known as the Brazilian redrump or the Brazilian wooly black. It is commonly found in southern Brazil and parts of Uruguay and is remarkably similar to Grammostola gigantea and Grammostola iheringi. It was first identified in 1903 by British zoologist R.I Pocock.

Description 
Females live 15 to 20 years, while males only live to about 6 years. Its namesake red opisthosoma becomes duller with age, but they do keep their other namesake. The rest of the body is a wooly texture and a black color.

Behavior 
They are very docile species, and they aren't by any means fast. They aren't skittish by any means, though they can be quite defensive at times. They often keep themselves out in the open, being a terrestrial tarantula from the New World.

References

External links
Brazilian Redrump Care

Theraphosidae
Spiders of South America
Fauna of Brazil
Fauna of Uruguay
Spiders described in 1903